Nabil El-Sibai  is a Syrian football midfielder who played for Syria in the 1984 Asian Cup.

References

Living people
Syrian footballers
Association football midfielders
1984 AFC Asian Cup players
Year of birth missing (living people)